3-Fluoromethcathinone  (also known as 3-FMC) is a chemical compound of the phenethylamine, amphetamine, and cathinone classes that has been sold online as a designer drug. It is a structural isomer of flephedrone (4-fluoromethcathinone).

3-Fluoroisomethcathinone is produced as a by-product when 3-FMC is synthesized, the activity of this compound is unknown.

Effects 
This chemical's effects and safety have not been studied scientifically.

Legal status 
In the United States, 3-FMC is Schedule I controlled substance.

In the United Kingdom, 3-FMC is a controlled drug under the cathinone blanket ban.

3-FMC is an Anlage II controlled drug in Germany.

3-FMC is banned in the Czech Republic.

See also 
 3,5-Difluoromethcathinone
 3-Fluoroamphetamine
 3-Fluoroethamphetamine
 3-Fluoromethamphetamine
 Substituted cathinone

References 

Cathinones
Designer drugs
Fluoroarenes
Norepinephrine-dopamine releasing agents